Autocharis arida is a moth in the family Crambidae. It was described by Wolfram Mey in 2011. It is found in South Africa and Namibia.

References

Moths described in 2011
Odontiinae
Moths of Africa